Orexin receptor type 1 (Ox1R or OX1), also known as  hypocretin receptor type 1 (HcrtR1), is a protein that in humans is encoded by the HCRTR1 gene.

Function 

The orexin 1 receptor (OX1), is a G-protein coupled receptor that is heavily expressed in projections from the lateral hypothalamus and is involved in the regulation of feeding behaviour.  OX1 selectively binds the orexin-A neuropeptide.  It shares 64% identity with OX2.

Ligands

Agonists
 Orexin-A

Antagonists

 RTIOX-276 - Selective OX1 antagonist
 ACT-335827 - Selective OX1 antagonist
 Almorexant - Dual OX1 and OX2 antagonist
 Lemborexant - Dual OX1 and OX2 antagonist
 Nemorexant - Dual OX1 and OX2 antagonist
 SB-334,867 - Selective OX1 antagonist
 SB-408,124 - Selective OX1 antagonist
 SB-649,868 - Dual OX1 and OX2 antagonist
 Suvorexant - Dual OX1 and OX2 antagonist

See also 
 Orexin receptor

References

External links

Further reading 

 
 
 
 
 
 
 
 
 
 
 
 
 
 
 
 

G protein-coupled receptors